Minuscule 162 (in the Gregory-Aland numbering), ε 214 (Soden), is a Greek minuscule manuscript of the New Testament, on parchment. It is dated by a colophon to the year 1153.
It has marginalia.

Description 
The codex contains a complete text of the four Gospels on 248 parchment leaves (size ). The text is written in one column per page, in 23 lines per page, in black ink, the capital letters in red.

There is also a division according to the smaller Ammonian Sections (in Mark 240, the last section in 16:19), (no references to the Eusebian Canons).

It contains the Epistula ad Carpianum, the Eusebian Canon tables at the beginning, pictures, and subscriptions at the end of each Gospel.

Text 
The Greek text of the codex is a representative of the Byzantine text-type. Hermann von Soden classified it to the textual family I (established by Pamphilus in Caesarea about 300 A.D.). Aland placed it in Category V.
According to the Claremont Profile Method it represents textual family Kx in Luke 1 and Luke 20. In Luke 10 it has mixture of the Byzantine families.

In Luke 11:2 it contains the very same remarkable reading than minuscule 700:  ("May your Holy Spirit come and cleanse us"), instead of "May your Kingdom come" in the Lord's Prayer.

History 
According to the colophon it was written 13 May 1153 by Presbyter Manuel.

It was slightly examined by Birch (about 1782) and Scholz (1794–1852). C. R. Gregory saw it in 1886.

It is currently housed at the Vatican Library (Barb. gr. 449), at Rome.

See also 
 List of New Testament minuscules
 Biblical manuscript
 Textual criticism

References

Further reading

External links 
 Minuscule 162 at the Encyclopedia of Textual Criticism

Greek New Testament minuscules
12th-century biblical manuscripts
Manuscripts of the Vatican Library